Andrew Earl (born ) is a former Australian male volleyball player. He was part of the Australia men's national volleyball team. He competed with the national team at the 2004 Summer Olympics in Athens, Greece. He played with Vigo in 2004.

Clubs
  Vigo (2004)

See also
 Australia at the 2004 Summer Olympics

References

1982 births
Living people
Australian men's volleyball players
Place of birth missing (living people)
Volleyball players at the 2004 Summer Olympics
Olympic volleyball players of Australia